Gianmarco Tamberi (born 1 June 1992) is an Italian high jumper, current Olympic champion (2020 Summer Olympics) and World indoor champion (2016). 

He won the 2021 Diamond League crown, becoming the first ever Italian to do so, and repeated this in 2022.

Career

Gianmarco is coached by his father, Marco Tamberi, who held the indoor Italian record in 1983 with a height of 2.28 m.

In 2015, Tamberi broke the Italian high jump record twice—first with a jump of 2.34 m in Cologne, and second with a 2.37 m in Eberstadt, where he was second behind Derek Drouin. He later finished 8th at the 2015 World Championships in Beijing with a clearance of 2.25 m.

During winter 2016, Tamberi won every contest he participated at. He won in Banska Bystrica with 2.35 m, a new Italian indoor record, equalled by Marco Fassinotti in the same event. He won in Trinec after clearing 2.33 m. At the 2016 High Jump Moravia Tour, he recorded a jump of 2.38 m, enough to beat Chris Baker of Great Britain and Kyriakos Ioannou of Cyprus, and which gave him the Italian indoor high jump record. He won a gold medal at the World Indoor Championships in Portland in March 2016 with a jump of 2.36 m.

Tamberi was unable to compete at the 2016 Olympics due to an injury earlier in the season.

At major competitions, he is known for sporting a full beard during qualification and shaving half of it for the final.

On 1 August 2021, he along with Qatari athlete Mutaz Essa Barshim were declared tied winners of the men's high jump at the 2020 Summer Olympics after a tie between both of them as they cleared 2.37m. Both Tamberi and Barshim agreed to share the gold medal in a rare instance in Olympic history where the athletes of different nations agreed to share the same medal. Barshim in particular was quoted in his postmatch presentation asking, "Can we have two golds?"

Statistics

National records
 High jump outdoor: 2.39 ( Monaco, 15 July 2016) - Current holder.
 High jump indoor: 2.38 ( Hustopeče, 13 February 2016) - Current holder

Progression
Best outdoor World ranking of Tamberi was 2nd in 2016, but he was indoor World leader in 2016 and 2021.

Outdoor

Indoor

Achievements

Circuit wins and titles
  Diamond League champion: 2021 and 2022. 

Meetings
2015
London Grand Prix (Diamond League) -  London, 2.28 m 
Meeting Eberstadt  -  Eberstadt, 2.37 m  
Weltklasse (Diamond League) -  Zürich, 2.23 m (5th)
2016 
High Jump Moravia Tour -  Hustopece, 2.38 m  
Meeting International Mohammed VI (Diamond League) -  Rabat, 2.25 m (6th)
Golden Gala (Diamond League) -  Rome, 2.30 m  
Müller Grand Prix (Diamond League) -  Birmingham, 2.20 m (8th)
Herculis (Diamond League) -  Monte Carlo, 2.39 m  
2017
Meeting de Paris (Diamond League) -  Paris, 
Meeting International Mohammed VI (Diamond League) -  Rabat, 2.27 m  
Müller Grand Prix (Diamond League) -  Birmingham, 2.20 m (7th)
Weltklasse (Diamond League) -  Zürich, 2.16 m (12th)
2018 
Athletissima (Diamond League) -  Lausanne, 2.25 m (9th)
Herculis (Diamond League) -  Monte Carlo, 2.27 m (5th) 
Eberstadt Internationales Hochsprung-Meeting -  Eberstadt, 2.33 m (2nd) 
Memorial van Damme (Diamond League) -  Brussels, 2.31 m (3rd)

National titles
Tamberi won the national championships 9 times.
 Italian Athletics Championships
 High jump: 2012, 2014, 2016, 2018, 2020, 2022 (6)
 Italian Indoor Athletics Championships
 High jump: 2016, 2019, 2021 (3)

See also
 List of Italian records in athletics
 Italian all-time top lists - High jump
 Men's high jump Italian record progression

Notes

References

External links

 

1992 births
Living people
People from Civitanova Marche
Sportspeople from the Province of Macerata
Italian male high jumpers
Athletes (track and field) at the 2012 Summer Olympics
Athletes (track and field) at the 2020 Summer Olympics
Olympic athletes of Italy
Athletics competitors of Fiamme Gialle
Athletics competitors of Fiamme Oro
World Athletics Championships athletes for Italy
European Athletics Championships winners
World Athletics Indoor Championships winners
European Athletics Indoor Championships winners
Italian Athletics Championships winners
Medalists at the 2020 Summer Olympics
Olympic gold medalists in athletics (track and field)
Olympic gold medalists for Italy
Diamond League winners